Violette Mbenza Masevo, known as Violette Mbenza, is a DR Congolese footballer. She has been a member of the DR Congo women's national team.

Club career
Mbenza has played for Grand Hôtel in the Democratic Republic of the Congo.

International career
Mbenza capped for the DR Congo at senior level during the 2006 African Women's Championship.

See also
 List of Democratic Republic of the Congo women's international footballers

References

External links

Living people
Democratic Republic of the Congo women's footballers
Democratic Republic of the Congo women's international footballers
Year of birth missing (living people)
Women's association footballers not categorized by position